In American football, an inflatable tunnel or air-inflated tunnel is a tunnel that is inflated by an external cold air inflation fan connected to the tunnel via an inflation tube.

Inflatable tunnels are typically used by professional, college and high school sports teams and first started appearing in the 1980s. Most NFL teams now use an inflatable tunnel for player introductions.  By 1996, inflatable tunnels began to be used by high school football programs, and their use is now common at the high school level in top football states like Texas.

See also
 List of inflatable manufactured goods

References

American football equipment
Balloons
Inflatable manufactured goods